Sir Charles Oakeley, 1st Baronet (27 February 1751 – 7 September 1826) was an English administrator. He married Helena Beatson, a talented amateur artist, and niece of notable Scottish portrait painter Catherine Read. He was the father of Frederick Oakeley and Sir Charles Oakeley, 2nd Baronet, and the grandfather of W. E. Oakeley.

Oakeley was born in Forton, Staffordshire, near Newport, a son of William Oakeley and Christian Strachan. He was educated at Shrewsbury School. The Oakeley Baronetcy of Shrewsbury was created for him on 5 June 1790. Oakeley worked as an administrator in India, and was responsible for collecting funds for the war when the Carnatic was invaded by Hyde Ally Cawn. The war came to an end in 1784 and Oakeley returned to England due to family reasons in February 1789, but he was persuaded to return to India, this time to serve as the Governor of Madras, he held this post from 1790 to 1794. He died at the Palace, Lichfield, on 7 September 1826, and was buried privately at Forton. There is a monument to his memory by Chantrey in Lichfield Cathedral.

Notes

References
Kidd, Charles, Williamson, David (gol.). Debrett's Peerage and Baronetage (1990 edition). New York: St Martin's Press, 1990, 

1751 births
1826 deaths
Baronets in the Baronetage of Great Britain
People from Forton, Staffordshire